Mikhail Ivanovich Zharov (27 October 1899 – 15 December 1981) was a Soviet and Russian stage and film actor and director. People's Artist of the USSR (1949) and Hero of Socialist Labour (1974).

He studied under the prominent director Theodore Komisarjevsky and debuted in Yakov Protazanov's Aelita (1924). Later he became a Protazanov regular, appearing in The Man from the Restaurant (1927) together with Mikhail Chekhov.

In the 1930s he was a leading actor of Alexander Tairov's Chamber Theatre, before moving to the Maly Theatre where he was engaged from 1938 till the rest of his life and most fully unfolded his actor's gift, mainly playing classical repertoire parts (in Wolves and Sheep, The Inspector-General, Heart is not a Stone, The Thunderstorm, etc.)

Mikhail Zharov gained wide popularity thanks to the role of Zhigan in Nikolai Ekk’s internationally known drama Road to Life (1931). Playing the leader of a gang of thieves, the actor made use of the opportunities of the first sound-film: he endowed his character with a specific accent, played the guitar and sang songs with his peculiar charm. In 1933 he appeared in Boris Barnet's Outskirts.

The most acclaimed of his sound films were Peter the Great (1937), in which he played Prince Menshikov, and Sergei Eisenstein's Ivan the Terrible (1942–44), in which he played Malyuta Skuratov. His last and probably most popular role was that of Aniskin, an amusing and witty village militiaman in the television series The Village Detective (1968), Aniskin & Fantomas (1974) and Aniskin Again (1978).

Zharov was awarded three Stalin Prizes: twice in 1941 and in 1942.

Partial filmography

 Tsar Ivan Vasilevich Groznyy (1915) – Soldier
 Aelita (1924) – Actor in Play
 His Call (1925)
 Chess Fever (1925)
 Miss Mend (1926)
 Man from the Restaurant (1927) – The Waiter
 Belyy oryol (1928)
 Don Diego and Pelagia (1928) – Himself
 Dva-Buldi-dva (1929)
 Road to Life (1931) – Tomka Zhigan
 The House of the Dead (1932) – Officer (uncredited)
 Dvadtsat shest komissarov (1932) – Menshevik
 Okraina (1933) – Krayevitch – Menchevik student
 Marionettes (1934) – Head of Frontier Post
 The Storm (1934) – Koudryash
 Three Comrades (1935) – The Engineer
 Lyubov i nenavist (1935) – Ensign Kukva
 Po sledam geroya (1936)
 The Return of Maxim (1937) – Platon Vassilievich Dymba, billiards braggart
 Peter the Great (1937, part 1) – Alexander Danilovich Menshikov
 The Bear (1938) – Alexander Danilovich Menshikov
 The Vyborg Side (1939) – Platon Vassilievich Dymba
 Man in a Shell (1939) – Mikhail Kovalenko
 Stepan Razin (1939) – Lazunka – boyar's son
 Engineer Kochin's Error (1939) – Lartsev
 Bogdan Khmelnitskiy (1941) – Deacon Gavrilo
 The Defense of Tsaritsyn (1942, part 1, 2) – Perchikhin
 The District Secretary (1942) – Gavril Fedorovich Rusov
 Aktrisa (1943) – Reciter in hospital
 In the Name of the Fatherland (1943) – Ivan Ivanovich Globa
 Taxi to Heaven (1943) – Ivan Baranov
 The Young Fritz (1943, Short) – Fritz
 Ivan the Terrible (1944, 1958, part 1, 2) – Czar's Guard Malyuta Skuratov
 The Call of Love (1945) – Vadim Spiridonovich Yeropkin
 Bespokoynoe khozyaystvo (1946) – Semibab
 For Those Who Are at Sea (1948) – Kharitonov
 Michurin (1949) – Khrenov
 Happy Flight (1949) – Driver Zachyosov
 Vassa Zheleznova (1953) – Prokhor Khrapov
 The Anna Cross (1954) – Artynov
 A Girl with a Guitar (1958) – Sviristinsky
 Mlechnyy Put (1959) – Mikhail Silovich
 Kain XVIII (1963) – Minister of War
 Vnimanie! V gorode volshebnik! (1964) – Cook
 Older sister (1967) – Ukhov
 Village Detective (1969) – Aniskin

References

External links

Biography of Mikhail Zharov

1899 births
1981 deaths
Male actors from Moscow
People from Moskovsky Uyezd
Communist Party of the Soviet Union members
Theatre directors from Moscow
Russian film directors
Russian male film actors
Russian male silent film actors
Soviet film directors
Soviet male film actors
Soviet male silent film actors
Soviet theatre directors
20th-century Russian male actors
Heroes of Socialist Labour
Honored Artists of the RSFSR
People's Artists of Azerbaijan
People's Artists of the RSFSR
People's Artists of the USSR
Stalin Prize winners
Recipients of the Order of Lenin
Recipients of the Order of the Red Banner of Labour
Recipients of the Order of the Red Star
Burials at Novodevichy Cemetery